

The Wabash Bridge carries one railroad track across the Mississippi River between Hannibal, Missouri, and Pike County, Illinois. Built by the Wabash Railroad, the bridge is today owned by the Norfolk Southern Railway.

On May 3, 1982, the towboat Northern King lost power in one engine while pushing 12 grain-filled barges in heavy currents. The craft struck a  truss span, which collapsed into the river, entangling the tug and several barges and halting river traffic for nine hours. Three barges broke loose and drifted downstream, missing Mark Twain Memorial Bridge. The bridge, then owned by Norfolk and Western Railway, predecessor of the current owner, was repaired.

Built as a swing span, the bridge was converted in 1994 to a vertical lift bridge to increase the width of the navigational channel. The vertical lift span was taken from a bridge over the Tennessee River at Florence, Alabama. To minimize the effect on river traffic, the new span was installed over the course of three days.

Before the Mark Twain Memorial Bridge opened in 1936, the Wabash Bridge was also a toll bridge carrying U.S. Route 36 across the river.

Gallery

See also
List of crossings of the Upper Mississippi River

References

External links
Hannibal's History
American Bridge projects - Hannibal
Modjeski Projects - Hannibal

Buildings and structures in Marion County, Missouri
Bridges in Pike County, Illinois
Railroad bridges in Missouri
Railroad bridges in Illinois
Bridges over the Mississippi River
Norfolk Southern Railway bridges
Wabash Railroad
Vertical lift bridges in Missouri
Vertical lift bridges in Illinois
Former toll bridges in Illinois
Former toll bridges in Missouri
Truss bridges in the United States
Interstate railroad bridges in the United States